The Girl and the Crisis is a 1917 American silent drama film directed by William V. Mong and starring Dorothy Davenport, Charles Perley and Harry Holden.

Cast
 Dorothy Davenport as Ellen Wilmot
 Charles Perley as Oliver Barnitz
 Harry Holden as Jacob Wilmot
 William V. Mong as The Honorable Peter Barnitz
 Alfred Hollingsworth as David Houston
 Forrest Seabury as John

References

Bibliography
 Langman, Larry. American Film Cycles: The Silent Era. Greenwood Publishing, 1998.

External links
 

1917 films
1917 drama films
1910s English-language films
American silent feature films
Silent American drama films
American black-and-white films
Universal Pictures films
Films directed by William V. Mong
1910s American films